Carolside is an estate by the Leader Water, in the Scottish Borders.

The house and estate
The late-18th-century house is a category B listed building, and is set in a former deer park. It was based on a design for Chesterfield House, Mayfair, London by the architect Isaac Ware. The drawing room contains a fireplace designed by Pietro Bossi, taken from Baronscourt, Co. Tyrone, around 1948.

The walled gardens include a national collection of pre-1900 Gallica roses, and are open to the public in July each year, as part of the Scotland's Gardens scheme.

Also on the estate is Park Bridge, a balustraded arch bridge linking the policies of Carolside House and those of Leadervale on the other side of the Leader.  The bridge dates to the late 18th century, and has been compared with other bridges designed by Alexander Stevens and William Elliot.

See also
List of places in the Scottish Borders

References

 
 Indexes to the Services of Heirs in Scotland, Edinburgh 1863, gives a time of death for James Lauder of Carolside, Berwickshire, and Whitslaid, Selkirkshire, as January 1799.

Category B listed buildings in the Scottish Borders
Listed houses in Scotland
Berwickshire